South America Tennis Confederation ( or COSAT) is a private non-profit organization, affiliated with International Tennis Federation. It is the regional body of tennis associations of most of the nations of the South America, excluding Guyana and Suriname, which are the members of Central American & Caribbean Tennis Confederation (COTECC).

Member nations
South America Tennis Confederation affiliates ten South American nations:

References

Tennis organizations
Sports governing bodies in South America
Sports organizations established in 1947
Tennis in South America
1947 establishments in South America